"Tears Will Be the Chaser for Your Wine" is a song written by Leroy Coates and Dale Davis. It was recorded and released as a single by American country, rock, and Christian artist, Wanda Jackson.

The song was recorded at the Columbia Recording Studio on April 19, 1966 in Nashville, Tennessee, United States. "Tears Will Be the Chaser for Your Wine" was officially released as a single in November 1966, peaking at number eleven on the Billboard Magazine Hot Country Singles chart. The song was issued on Jackson's 1966 studio album, Reckless Love Affair.

Music journalist, Robert K. Oermann and anthropologist, Mary A. Bufwack called this song, among Jackson's other late 1960s recordings, "self-assertive about women's issues".

Chart performance

References 

1966 singles
Wanda Jackson songs
Song recordings produced by Ken Nelson (American record producer)
1966 songs
Capitol Records singles